Justice Lacy may refer to:

Benjamin W. Lacy, associate justice of the Supreme Court of Virginia
Elizabeth B. Lacy, associate justice of the Supreme Court of Virginia
Thomas J. Lacy, associate justice of the Arkansas Supreme Court